Loyce is a female given name. Notable people with this name include:

 Loyce Biira Bwambale
 Loyce Houlton (1925–1995), American dancer, choreographer, dance pedagogue, and arts administrator
 Loyce Pace, American public health policy expert
 Loyce W. Turner
 Loyce Whiteman, American popular singer

See also
 Lois